Dennis Iliadis (born 31 December 1969) is a Greek film director. He is best known for his work on The Last House on the Left.

Biography
Born in Athens, Iliadis grew up in Athens, Paris, and Rio de Janeiro. He attended Brown University and the Royal College of Art. He has worked on films such as Hardcore, The Last House on the Left, and +1. At the 2009 Brussels International Fantastic Film Festival, he won the Silver Raven Award for his work on The Last House on the Left.

Filmography
Feature films
 Hardcore (2004)
 The Last House on the Left (2009)
 +1 (2013)
 Delirium (2018)
 He's Out There (2018) (credited as Quinn Lasher)

Awards
 2009 Brussels International Fantastic Film Festival: Silver Raven Award (The Last House on the Left)

References

External links
 
 

Greek film directors
Film people from Athens
1969 births
Living people
Horror film directors